The Yauco River is a river that goes through Guayanilla and Yauco, municipalities in Puerto Rico.

The Antonio Lucchetti Dam and Reservoir is on the Yauco River.

Hurricane Maria 
Significant rainfall from Hurricane Maria on September 20, 2017 caused the Yauco River to overflow, flooding and decimating entire neighborhoods.

Gallery

See also
List of rivers of Puerto Rico

References

External links
 USGS Hydrologic Unit Map – Caribbean Region (1974)

Rivers of Puerto Rico